Ventenata is a genus of plants in the grass family, native to Europe, North Africa, and central + southwest Asia. One species, Ventenata dubia, is considered an invasive weed in many places.

 Species
 Ventenata blanchei Boiss. - Lebanon, Syria, Palestine, Jordan, Israel
 Ventenata dubia (Leers) Coss. & Durieu - central Europe, Mediterranean, Ukraine, southern  European Russia, Caucasus, Turkey, Kazakhstan; naturalized in parts of North America
 Ventenata eigiana (H.Scholz & Raus) Dogan - Turkey
 Ventenata huber-morathii (Dogan) D.Heller - Turkey
 Ventenata macra (Steven) Balansa ex Boiss. - Greece, Crimea, Turkmenistan, Turkey, Iran, Iraq, Turkey, Caucasus, Cyprus
 Ventenata quercetorum Boiss. & Bal. - Turkey
 Ventenata sorgerae (Dogan) D.Heller - Turkey
 Ventenata subenervis Boiss. & Balansa - Turkey, islands of Eastern Aegean

References

Pooideae
Grasses of Asia
Grasses of Africa
Grasses of Europe
Grasses of Russia
Poaceae genera